Hilliard Airpark  is a public-use airport located  east of the central business district of the town of Hilliard in Nassau County, Florida, United States. The airport is publicly owned.

References

External links
 

Airports in Florida
Transportation buildings and structures in Nassau County, Florida